Jack Percival (16 May 1913 – 1979) was an English footballer who played in the half back position for  Manchester City between 1933 and 1946 and then for Bournemouth & Boscombe Athletic and Murton Coliiery Welfare.

Career
Percival became a Manchester City player in 1933 making his debut in a 1–0 victory against Aston Villa. Bobby Marshall scored the goal for City in that game. He began to become a regular in the team in 1936, replacing Matt Busby who was eventually sold to Liverpool. During his time at Manchester City, Percival picked up a Championship medal and a Division Two title. He played until 1946, appearing 161 times and scoring eight goals.

Honours

 Manchester City
 Football League First Division: 1936–37
 Football League Second Division: 1946–47

References

External links

1913 births
1979 deaths
Footballers from County Durham
English footballers
Association football wing halves
Manchester City F.C. players
English Football League players
Durham City A.F.C. players
AFC Bournemouth players
Murton A.F.C. players
Date of death missing
People from Pittington